In mathematics, Lady Windermere's Fan is a telescopic identity employed to relate global and local error of a numerical algorithm. The name is derived from Oscar Wilde's 1892 play Lady Windermere's Fan, A Play About a Good Woman.

Lady Windermere's Fan for a function of one variable
Let  be the exact solution operator so that:

with  denoting the initial time and  the function to be approximated with a given .

Further let ,  be the numerical approximation at time , .  can be attained by means of the approximation operator  so that:
 with 

The approximation operator represents the numerical scheme used. For a simple explicit forward Euler method with step width  this would be: 

The local error  is then given by:

In abbreviation we write:

Then Lady Windermere's Fan for a function of a single variable  writes as:

with a global error of

Explanation

See also
 Baker–Campbell–Hausdorff formula
 Numerical error

Numerical analysis